Samart Castle is a château-ferme, or fortified farmhouse, in Samart in the municipality of Philippeville, province of Namur, Wallonia, Belgium.

The medieval building was extensively renovated in the 16th and 17th centuries, leaving only the watchtower of the original structure.

See also
List of castles in Belgium

Castles in Belgium
Castles in Namur (province)
Philippeville